Saint Nicolas Tower (1384) along with the Lantern tower and the Chain tower, is one of the three medieval towers guarding the port in La Rochelle, France. In 1879 the French government classified it as a Monument historique (MH).

History
The Saint Nicolas Tower was named after the patron saint of sailors, This tower along with the Chain Tower (La tour de la Chaîne) stood at the entryway to the Port of La Rochelle. At times throughout history a chain was stretched between the two buildings to stop ships from entering. the building was also used as a prison throughout its history. The tower looks as it did in the 1400s.

See also
Centre des monuments nationaux
Vauclair castle
La Rochelle Cathedral

References

External links

 
 La Rochelle et Son Histoire: Tours 
 Église paroissiale Saint-Barthélemy à La Rochelle 
Photos, French Ministry of Culture

Buildings and structures in La Rochelle
Tourist attractions in La Rochelle
Historic sites in France
Monuments historiques of Nouvelle-Aquitaine